Shahada or Shahadah is an Islamic oath, one of the Five Pillars of Islam.

Shahada or variants may also refer to:

Places
 Shahada, Maharashtra, India
Shahada (Vidhan Sabha constituency)
 Shahad, Thāne district, Maharashtra, India
Shahad railway station

People
 Abdul-Ghani Shahad (born 1968), Iraqi footballer 
 Greg Shahade (born 1978), American chess player
 Jennifer Shahade (born 1980), American chess player
 Raghdan Shehadeh (born 1977), Syrian footballer
 Rafiq Shahadah (born 1956), Syrian army general
 Rasha Shehada (born c. 1985), Palestine businesswoman
 Salah Shehade (1953–2002), former member of Hamas

Other uses
 Shahada (film), a 2010 German film

See also

 Martyrdom (shahadat in Punjabi)